Wild in the Country was a music festival organized by record label Renaissance and held from 2004 to 2007.

The first Wild in the Country event was held at Shugborough Hall in Staffordshire, England on 1 May 2004. Acts who appeared at the first event were Scissor Sisters, Sasha & John Digweed, Dave Seaman, James Zabiela, Derrick Carter, Yousef, Infusion, Neneh Cherry, Jon Carter, and Audio Bullies.

Gigwise.com describes Wild in the Country as "the ideal festival for lovers of electronic music." and notes that the festival is part of a Renaissance tradition of holding gigs in picturesque settings like Allerton Castle and Shugborough Hall. The last festival was at Knebworth Park starting on 30 June 2007 with Underworld, Hot Chip, and Sasha and Digweed.

The 2008 festival scheduled to be held at Knebworth Park, Hertfordshire on 5 July was canceled two days prior to the event "due to lower than expected ticket sales and a key investor withdrawing at the last minute, leaving the event in an unsustainable position." The decision came a week after headliner Björk canceled her appearance having failed to come to terms with the organizers over staging logistics.

2007 line up 
Underworld
Hot Chip
Sasha
John Digweed
2ManyDJ's
Tiga
Eric Prydz
Ricardo Villalobos
François K
Erol Alkan
Tiefschwarz
Simian Mobile Disco
Justice
Mathew Jonson
Luciano
Damian Lazarus
Filthy Dukes
Robin Porter
Dave Martin
Geddes - Mulletover

2008
The scheduled line-up for the 2008 edition which was cancelled two days before it was due to begin was:

Björk
Battles
Soulwax
Foals
Pendulum
Booka Shade
Hercules & Love Affair
The Presets
Kissy Sell Out
The Cuban Brothers
Dan le sac vs Scroobius Pip
Metronomy
Killa Kela
Audion
Hearthrob
The Field
XX Teens
Slagsmålsklubben

See also
List of electronic music festivals
Live electronic music

References 

Resident Advisor news release on the festival
Gigwise page on the festival

External links
Renaissance website - requires Adobe Flash
Renaissance official Myspace page - with links to audio and video clips

Music festivals established in 2004
Music festivals in England
Recurring events disestablished in 2008
2004 establishments in England
Music festivals in Hertfordshire
Music festivals in Staffordshire
Electronic music festivals in the United Kingdom